The coat of arms of the Pitcairn Islands is an official emblem of the British Overseas Territory of the Pitcairn Islands and was granted by royal warrant on 4 November 1969. The flag of the Pitcairn Islands, also an official emblem, consists of a Blue Ensign displaying the coat of arms and was granted on 2 April 1984.

Coat of arms 
Additionally, the Bible symbolises Christianity, which the mutineers brought to the island. The shield is surrounded by a green and gold wreath, and crested by a helmet bearing a wheelbarrow and a slip of miro, a local tree, which represent the role agriculture played in helping the mutineers survive on the island. The slip of miro also represents the wood used by Pitcairn Islanders for crafting souvenirs.

Flag 
The Pitcairn flag features a Blue Ensign with the Pitcairn coat of arms defaced on the fly. The design was suggested by the Island Council in December 1980 and approved on 2 April 1984. It was first flown in May 1984, during a visit by the then-governor Sir Richard Stratton.

Gallery

References

Sources

External links 

Flag of the Pitcairn Islands at the Flag Institute.

Flag
National flags
Blue Ensigns
Flags of British Overseas Territories
Flags introduced in 1984
British Overseas Territories coats of arms
National coats of arms
Symbols introduced in 1969
Coats of arms with anchors
Coats of arms with books
Coats of arms with wheels
1984 establishments in the Pitcairn Islands
Pitcairn Islands culture